Monkeypot Merganzer is the third studio album by Critters Buggin of Seattle, Washington and was released in 1997. Originally released independently, Monkeypot Merganzer was reissued by Kufala Recordings in 2004.

Track listing
 "Space Rant" - 4:30 
 "Snaggletooth" - 4:15
 "Mellow G" - 4:33
 "Hello Kitty" - 7:04
 "Burundi" - 6:18
 "AIDS" - 1:55
 "Na-Na" - 2:46
 "I'm Hungary" - 7:21
 "Bonus Track" - 0:41

Personnel
Matt Chamberlain - drums
Brad Houser - bass
Skerik - saxophone
Guest musicians
 "Space Rant" - Maurice Caldwell (vocal)
 "Hello Kitty" - Dave Palmer (Rhodes wah-wah)
 "AIDS" - Eyvind Kang (violin and air-hu), Keith Lowe (upright bass), Craig Flory (bass clarinet), Mike Dillon (vibes and percussion)

References

1997 albums
Critters Buggin albums
Albums produced by Stone Gossard